Ang Lalake sa Parola, English title The Man in the Lighthouse is a 2007-independent gay-themed Filipino film directed by Filipino film director Joselito Altarejos, a homoerotic journey in finding one's true self and the memories and recollections that stay with us till the end. The film stars Harry Laurel, Jennifer Lee and Justin De Leon.

Some of the overtly sexual scenes were removed from the original for the general theatrical release in the Philippines, but were made available on the eventual video releases. Filipino actor Harry Laurel appears in full-frontal nudity in the film.

Synopsis
It is a story of relationships in a small town called Lobo most known for its lighthouse and the local legend says that it is inhabited by a fairy who seduces desirable men who then never marry.

Mateo (Harry Laurel) has been searching for his father Fernando (Richard Quan) who left when he was five. His search leads him to Lobo. Awaiting his father's return, Mateo agrees to work as the caretaker of the lighthouse. Although he is courting Suzette (Jennifer Lee), a teacher in the town, his meeting with Jerome (Justin de Leon), a gay man from Manila discovers them making love.

What follows from this accidental meeting of Mateo and Jerome is the beginning of a homoerotic journey, while Suzette desperately longs for love and Mateo's attention. Mateo is also affected by Perida (Monti Parungao), a local gay man, who has to pay local teenage boys for sex, as he opens up to Mateo about his suffering as a gay man.

What begins as a search for one's father evolves into a search for one's own self, putting Mateo in a dilemma, in the midst of his conservative rural community, and should he cross the thin line between being straight and being gay?

Cast
Harry Laurel as Mateo
Jennifer Lee as Suzette
Justin De Leon as Jerome
Crispin Pineda	as Tisho
Allan Paule as Young Tisho
Sheree	as Diwata
Richard Quan as Fernando Atienza
Monti Parungao as Perida
Dexter Doria as Lucy
Micol Manansala as Hilario
Wilma Lusanta as Mrs. Atienza
Sean Michael Valera as Ronnel
Mariel Valera as Anna
Arman Enriquez as Arman
Arvin Reyes as Boy who had sex with Perida
May-i Fabros as May-i
Lex Bonife as Jamir
Anna Liao as Aya
Benjie Hilado as Carlos
Dax Alejandro as Fidel

Award nominations
2008: Nominated for "Best Production Design" (for Ma. Asuncion Torres and Anna Carmela Manda) during the Philippines FAP Awards
2008: Nominated for "Best Performance by an Actor in a Supporting Role in a Drama, Musical or Comedy" (for Justin De Leon) during the Philippines Golden Screen Awards

See also
 List of Filipino films
 List of lesbian, gay, bisexual or transgender-related films
 List of lesbian, gay, bisexual, or transgender-related films by storyline
 List of Philippine films of the 2000s
 Nudity in film (East Asian cinema since 1929)

References

External links
IMDb.com The Man in the Lighthouse page

2007 films
Philippine LGBT-related films
LGBT-related drama films
2007 drama films
2007 independent films
2007 LGBT-related films
Gay-related films
Philippine drama films